OR Insight is a peer-reviewed academic journal covering operations research. It is an official journal of The Operational Research Society. OR Insight publishes full length case-oriented papers aimed at managers, consultants and operational research practitioners.

Abstracting and indexing 
The journal is abstracted and indexed by Association of Business Schools' Academic Journal Quality Guide, International Abstracts in Operations Research, and PASCAL.

External links 
 

Publications established in 1988
Quarterly journals
Business and management journals
English-language journals
Palgrave Macmillan academic journals
Operational Research Society academic journals